JRK may refer to:
 Jakub Rene Kosik (born 1983), Polish musician
 JRK Property Holdings, an American real estate holding and property management company